The 2000 Western Michigan Broncos football team was an American football team that represented Western Michigan University during the 2000 NCAA Division I-A football season. In their fourth season under head coach Gary Darnell, the team compiled a 9–3 record, finished in a tie for first place in the West Division of the Mid-American Conference (MAC), and lost to the Marshall Thundering Herd in the 2000 MAC Championship Game. The team played its home games at Waldo Stadium in Kalamazoo, Michigan.

The team's statistical leaders were Jeff Welsh with 2,537 passing yards, Robert Sanford with 1,571 rushing yards, and Steve Neal with 67 catches for 848 receiving yards.  Sanford  was selected as the MAC's most valuable player and the offensive player of the year. Gary Darnell was named the MAC coach of the year.

Schedule

Roster

References

Western Michigan
Western Michigan Broncos football seasons
Western Michigan Broncos football